San Vicente Canton may refer to:
 San Vicente Canton, Bolivia
 San Vicente Canton, Ecuador

Canton name disambiguation pages